Maunga Kabuku (born 6 June 1985) is a retired Zambian football midfielder.

References

1985 births
Living people
Zambian footballers
Zambia international footballers
National Assembly F.C. players
Zanaco F.C. players
Kabwe Warriors F.C. players
NAPSA Stars F.C. players
Association football midfielders